Latele Novela Network is a Spanish-language television network in the United States. It is the first premier national Hispanic television network dedicated entirely to telenovelas in Spanish for the US Hispanic market. The network was launched on November 1, 2005.

See also
 List of United States television networks

External links and sources
Official site (in Spanish)
Official corporate site
Spanish International Network historical site

Spanish-language television networks in the United States
Television channels and stations established in 2005